The 1965 NASCAR Grand National Series was the seventeenth season of the premier Grand National Series stock car racing championship sanctioned by NASCAR. Due to the no availability of the Hemi, GM "Mystery Motor" and Ford overhead cam 427, NASCAR banned those non-production engines.  Chrysler responded by withdrawing their support, and drivers Richard Petty, David Pearson, Paul Goldsmith, Bobby Isaac until the Chrysler HEMI had sold 500 units in production vehicles, meeting NASCAR's homologation standards of 500 units.    Driver Ned Jarrett won the Grand National Drivers Championship after winning 13 of the 54 races he competed in, he clinched the title with 3 races remaining in the season after finishing 5th in the National 400 from Charlotte Motor Speedway. Ford won the Manufacturers Championship again.

The newly built Rockingham Speedway opened in 1965, and Curtis Turner returned from his ban to win the inaugural race in his Ford.  Turner had been banned from NASCAR in 1961 by Bill France, Sr. for trying to organize a drivers' union with the Teamsters.

Schedule

Expansion 
Fords had won 34 races before NASCAR adjusted the rules to allow the Chryslers to compete, but it was too late in the 55 event season for them to mount a championship challenge.

References

Bibliography 

 

 

NASCAR Cup Series seasons